is a private junior college in Matsumoto, Nagano, Japan. It was established in 1972; the predecessor of the school was founded a year before. Despite the similarity in the names, this school and Matsumoto University are unrelated.

External links
 Official website 

Educational institutions established in 1971
Private universities and colleges in Japan
Universities and colleges in Nagano Prefecture
Japanese junior colleges